

518001–518100 

|-bgcolor=#f2f2f2
| colspan=4 align=center | 
|}

518101–518200 

|-bgcolor=#f2f2f2
| colspan=4 align=center | 
|}

518201–518300 

|-bgcolor=#f2f2f2
| colspan=4 align=center | 
|}

518301–518400 

|-bgcolor=#f2f2f2
| colspan=4 align=center | 
|}

518401–518500 

|-id=458
| 518458 Roblambert ||  || Robert Andrew Lambert (1955–2019), a former president of the Las Vegas Astronomical Society and astronomy professor at College of Southern Nevada. || 
|}

518501–518600 

|-id=523
| 518523 Bryanshumaker || 2006 SV || Bryan Shumaker (born 1949) is a urologist who helped design a dye-sensing device to treat cancer. As an accomplished and enthusiastic amateur astronomer, he has taken a leading role in the development of outreach programs in northern Michigan, particularly at the Headlands International Dark Sky Park there. || 
|}

518601–518700 

|-bgcolor=#f2f2f2
| colspan=4 align=center | 
|}

518701–518800 

|-bgcolor=#f2f2f2
| colspan=4 align=center | 
|}

518801–518900 

|-bgcolor=#f2f2f2
| colspan=4 align=center | 
|}

518901–519000 

|-bgcolor=#f2f2f2
| colspan=4 align=center | 
|}

References 

518001-519000